Veeraghattam is a town(Mandal) located in Parvathipuram Manyam district of the Indian state of Andhra Pradesh.It is located in Veeraghattam mandal of Palakonda revenue division.

Geography 

Veeraghattam is located near the Vattigedda river and Eastern Ghats.

Demographics 

 census, Veeraghattam (fondly called Veeragottam) had a population of 14,315; of which half of them are from the Bhogi descent. The total population constitute, 6,911 males and 7,404 females —a sex ratio of 1071 females per 1000 males. 1,427 children are in the age group of 0–6 years, of which 741 are boys and 686 are girls. The average literacy rate stands at 70.89% with 8,638 literates, significantly higher than the district average of 61.70%. Owing to the tropical climate, agriculture and small scale business is the major occupation of the maximum population. There is no railway transport to this  location, the nearest railway station is Parvatipuram Town at a distance of 27 km.

Notables 

 Kodi Rammurthy 
 Karri Narayana Rao, member of 4th and 5th Lok Sabha representing Bobbili, was born in Santha Narsipuram village.

References 

Villages in Parvathipuram Manyam district